Recep Tayyip Erdoğan Hospital, Muzaffargarh also known as Turkey Hospital is a tertiary care hospital, serving Muzaffargarh, Pakistan and adjoining cities.
The hospital was built with the financial assistance from Turkish President Recep Tayyip Erdoğan.
This hospital was completed by the Turkish Cooperation and Coordination Agency. Its expansion started in 2017 and was completed in 2018.

Services offered
Accident & Emergency Room
Daycare services
Family Medicine Clinic
General Medicine
Pediatric Medicine & Nutrition
General Surgery (Advance Laparoscopic Surgery)
Cardiology
Orthopedic
Endocrinology (including Diabetes Care)
Rheumatology
Dermatology
Ophthalmology
Obstetrics & Gynecology
Anesthesiology
Oral & Maxillofacial
Dialysis Services
Physiotherapy & Rehabilitation
Neonatology
Urology
Family Planning
Laboratory
Radiology

References

Muzaffargarh
Hospitals in Punjab, Pakistan
Muzaffargarh District
2017 establishments in Pakistan
Pakistan–Turkey relations